The Tojolabal are a Maya people of the Mexican state of Chiapas. They traditionally speak the Tojolabal language.

Population density
The Tojolabal people are spread across the state of Chiapas, Mexico. Las Margaritas is believed to have the largest group of Tojolabal, with the next largest in population density being Comitán. Around the municipalities, there are 439 Tojolabal villages in which most of the population resides.

Archaeology
The Tojolabal people are known for the ancient site of K'atepan, a temple plaza against a mountainside which can be accessed by large stairways.

See also
Wajxaklajun

References

Populated places in Chiapas
Indigenous peoples in Mexico
Maya peoples